Symbiosis is a British musical ensemble which creates relaxing, ambient music. Symbiosis was first formed in 1987 and consisted of a trio with: flautist, John Hackett; guitarist and cellist, Richard Bolton; and singer, flautist, keyboard player and percussionist, Clive Williamson. Symbiosis' music is used mainly by individuals, therapists and their clients, hospitals, and businesses as a means of relaxation. Symbiosis' music is free-flowing and melodic, as to not disturb deep relaxation of the listener. The group is best known for its album Touching the Clouds (1992), which was found to produce the lowest heart-beat rate in a test at Kingston University and was later recommended by doctors at St Bartholomew's Hospital in London to help reduce stress.

Other musicians who have played on albums by Symbiosis include: Ian Ritchie (soprano sax); Ashley Drees (cittern and mandolin); Michèle Drees (percussion); Sarah Devonald (oboe & cor anglais); Rupert Flindt (fretless bass); Maloviere (tsimbala and violin); Nicki Paxman (violin and keyboards); and Emily Jane Sinclair (flute and vocals).

In 1995/6, the group's founder-member Clive Williamson travelled to New Zealand to make digital recordings of its unique natural sounds, which were released by Symbiosis in 1997 (in both NZ and the UK) as 'AOTEAROA - Nature Sounds of New Zealand'. The album included birdsong from endemic species including the tui, korimako (New Zealand bellbird) and the endangered tieke (saddleback) and hihi (stitchbird), some of which was recorded on the offshore natural reserves of Kapiti Island and Tiritiri Matangi Island. The album was extended in 2017 and remastered and reissued with new recordings (including the rare kokako) in 2018 under the title: 'New Zealand Naturally'.

In 2021, the group increased its interest in using natural sounds to reduce stress and increase wellbeing, releasing At Peace with Nature - Relaxing Sounds for Mindful Moments. Sound designer and musician Clive Williamson drew on his experience as a Producer and Studio Manager with the BBC to create a series of 'virtual nature walks' in sound. The recordings were made over 25 years in four different countries, with locations including Devon's coast, Dartmoor and Kew in the United Kingdom; the Australian bush; nature reserves, Lake Rotoiti and Rotorua in New Zealand; and the Llanos and Amazon regions of Colombia.

Discography 
 1988 - Tears of the Moon (CD release 2001)
 1988 - Song of the Peach Tree Spring (CD release 1998)
 1992 - Touching the Clouds 
 1992 - Atmospheres (Deleted)
 1992 - The Inner Voice (Deleted)
 1994 - Lake of Dreams 
 1995 - Autumn Days 
 1995 - Angels! Angels! Angels! with author and lecturer Denise Linn 
 1996 - Phoenix Rising with author and lecturer Denise Linn
 1996 - Amber & Jade 
 1997 - AOTEAROA - Nature Sounds of New Zealand 
 1997 - Dreams with author and lecturer Denise Linn 
 1998 - Instinctive Feng Shui for Creating Sacred Space (video, with Denise Linn)
 1999 - Sea of Light 
 2002 - The Comfort Zone (Compilation) 
 2002 - Secrets & Mysteries - the Glory and Pleasure of being a Woman with Denise Linn
 2005 - Dancing in your Dreams (Compilation) 
 2017 - Air & Grace with flautist John Hackett (Compilation)
 2017 - AOTEAROA - Nature Sounds of New Zealand (Extended Edition) 
 2018 - Flowing with the Tide with Clive Williamson
 2018 - New Zealand Naturally by Clive Williamson & Symbiosis
 2019 - Songs of Hope - The Dawn Chorus, Tiritiri Matangi Island, New Zealand by Clive Williamson & Symbiosis
 2021 - At Peace with Nature - Relaxing Sounds for Mindful Moments by Clive Williamson & Symbiosis

References

External links 
Symbiosis Home Page
New Zealand Sound Recordings
Music Technology magazine 'Sound Archives' published by Symbiosis

New-age music groups
British ambient music groups
Musical groups established in 1987